The red-bellied malimbe (Malimbus erythrogaster) is a species of bird in the family Ploceidae.
It is found in Cameroon, Central African Republic, Republic of the Congo, Democratic Republic of the Congo, Equatorial Guinea, Gabon, Nigeria, South Sudan, and Uganda.

References

red-bellied malimbe
Birds of Central Africa
red-bellied malimbe
Taxonomy articles created by Polbot